Scott Humphrey is a Canadian record producer and mix engineer.  He began his music career as a keyboard player and programmer. He is best known for his work with multiplatinum recording artist Rob Zombie and has co-written, co-produced and mixed all of his records up to 2007's Zombie Live. He was also Rob Zombie's co-composer for the score to Zombie's film House of 1000 Corpses. Much of the production work was done at Humphrey's studio, The Chop Shop.

He is widely known for his keyboards, producing, engineering, mixing and remixing, and digital audio skills with Mötley Crüe, Metallica, Fuel, Methods of Mayhem, BT, Monster Magnet, Tommy Lee, Day of Fire, Powerman 5000, The Cult, Andrew WK, Spineshank, *NSYNC and many more. Humphrey has also co-authored and arranged songs with some of the artists he has worked with.

According to Digidesign’s chief software programmer Mark Jeffery, Humphrey conceptualized and motivated him to write Beat Detective, Batch Crossfades and Sound Replacer for the Pro Tools audio workstation platform.

Humphrey was also the co-founder of Artist 2 Market Distribution in 2004, which offered artists an avenue of direct to retail marketing while still retaining the ownership of their original master recordings. A2M achieved a number 1 country single with Tracy Lawrence with the hit song “Find Out Who Your Friends Are” from 2007. Artist 2 Market was acquired by Rocket Science in 2009.

He is the founder of the iPhone application Jammit that utilizes the master recordings from various artists in the music industry. Featured artists include Alice Cooper, Boston, Foreigner, No Doubt, Nickelback, Sum 41, Godsmack and many more. As of December 2011, Jammit was available for the iPad, iPhone, iPod touch using IOS 5.0 and lastly, the desktop version for Mac OS X (10.6.8 or higher) which beta tested in February and released in mid March.  Future releases of the application are slated for desktop PC before summer 2012. An Android version is being considered for release in the near future but Scott has stated this will require redevelopment of the app from the ground up.

Humphrey is also founder of thepublicrecord.com, which sourced the general public for track contributions to produce one of the largest scale collaboration albums ever produced, Tommy Lee's Methods of Mayhem album, "A Public Disservice Announcement". Scott and Tommy listened to every submission, totaling over 10,000 from all over the world to select the most suitable contributions to be edited into the existing stems. The public contributors for each track are given mention for their submissions by name in the cd sleeve credits.

In Mötley Crüe's autobiography The Dirt: Confessions of the World's Most Notorious Rock Band, Crüe guitar player Mick Mars accused Humphrey of dividing the band and subverting his musical input during the Generation Swine sessions. Other band members blamed Humphrey for the chaotic nature of the sessions and the scattershot musical directions the band was taking. Although Tommy Lee has continued to work with Humphrey on all of his solo projects, Mötley Crüe have never collaborated with him again.

Discography

Albums
 Triumph - The Sport of Kings (1986) Keyboards
 Lee Aaron - Bodyrock (1989) Drum and Bass Programming
 Julian Lennon - Help Yourself (1991) Keyboards, Programming
 Robin Zander - Robin Zander (1993) Keyboards, Synthesizer
 The Melvins - Stoner Witch (1994) Programming
 The Cult - The Cult (1994) Keyboards, Programming
 Mötley Crüe - Generation Swine (1997) Co-Producer, Synthesizer, Computer programming, Backing vocals, Co-Writer
 Powerman 5000 - Tonight the Stars Revolt! (1997) Programming, Mixing
 Rob Zombie - Hellbilly Deluxe (1998) Co-Producer, Co-Writer, Programming
 Methods of Mayhem - Methods of Mayhem (1999) Co-Producer
 Rob Zombie - American Made Music to Strip By (1999) Producer
 Rob Zombie - The Sinister Urge (2001) Co-Producer, Co-Writer, Programming, Additional guitar
 Tommy Lee - Never a Dull Moment (2001) Co-Producer
 *NSYNC - No Strings Attached (October 2002) Engineer
 Andrew W.K. - The Wolf (2003) Co-Producer, Mixing
 Spineshank - Self-Destructive Pattern (2003) Engineer
 Rob Zombie - Past, Present & Future (2003) Producer, Programming, Engineer, Mixing, Co-Writer
 Element Eighty - Element Eighty (2003) Producer, Mixing
 Day of Fire - Day of Fire (2004) Producer, Mixing
 Sôber - Reddo (2004) Mixing
 Monster Magnet - Monolithic Baby! (2004) Mixing, Co-Producer
 Jack's Mannequin - Everything In Transit (2005) Drum Engineering
 Rob Zombie - Educated Horses (2006) Co-Producer, Co-Writer, Additional guitar, Additional bass, Background vocals
 Tommy Lee - Tommyland: The Ride (2006) Co-Producer, Mixing, Guitar, Keyboards
 Rob Zombie - Zombie Live (2007) Co-Producer
 Fuel - Angels & Devils (2007) Co-Producer
 Genitorturers - Blackheart Revolution (2009) Co-Producer
 Methods of Mayhem - A Public Disservice Announcement (2010) Co-Producer, Synthesizer, Piano, Backing vocals, Co-writer

Songs
 Nine Inch Nails - "Closer (Internal)" from Closer to God (EP) (1994) Remixing
 Nine Inch Nails - "Closer (Further Away)" from Closer to God (EP) (1994) Remixing
 Ozzy Osbourne - "Facing Hell" from Down to Earth (2001) Co-Writer
 Rob Zombie - "Blitzkrieg Bop" from We're a Happy Family: A Tribute to Ramones (2003) Co-Producer
 BT - "Superfabulous (Scott Humphrey Radio Mix)" from The Technology EP (2004) Remixing
 Thousand Foot Krutch - "Everyone Like Me" from Set It Off (2004) Producer

Film scores
 House of 1000 Corpses (2003) Co-composer

References

Year of birth missing (living people)
Living people
Musicians from Ontario
Canadian record producers
Canadian rock keyboardists
Place of birth missing (living people)